The Syntax Definition Formalism (SDF) is a metasyntax used to define context-free grammars: that is, a formal way to describe formal languages. It can express the entire range of context-free grammars. Its current version is SDF3. A parser and parser generator for SDF specifications are provided as part of the free ASF+SDF Meta Environment. These operate using the SGLR (Scannerless GLR parser). An SDF parser outputs parse trees or, in the case of ambiguities, parse forests.

Overview
Features of SDF:

 Supports the entire range of context-free languages
 Allows modular syntax definitions (grammars can import subgrammars) which enables reuse
 Supports annotations

Examples
The following example defines a simple Boolean expression syntax in SDF2:

 module basic/Booleans
 
 exports
   sorts Boolean
   context-free start-symbols Boolean
 
 context-free syntax
    "true"                      -> Boolean
    "false"                     -> Boolean
    lhs:Boolean "|" rhs:Boolean -> Boolean {left}         
    lhs:Boolean "&" rhs:Boolean -> Boolean {left}       
    "not" "(" Boolean ")"       -> Boolean           
    "(" Boolean ")"             -> Boolean
 
  context-free priorities
    Boolean "&" Boolean -> Boolean >
    Boolean "|" Boolean -> Boolean

Program analysis and transformation systems using SDF
ASF+SDF Meta Environment provides SDF
RascalMPL
Spoofax/IMP 
Stratego/XT
Strafunski

See also
GNU bison
ANTLR

References

Further reading 
A Quick Introduction to SDF, Visser, J. & Scheerder, J. (2000) CWI
The Syntax Definition Formalism SDF, Mark van den Brand, Paul Klint, Jurgen Vinju (2007) CWI

External links 
Grammar Deployment Kit
SdfMetz computes metrics for SDF grammars
Download SDF from the ASF+SDF Meta Environment homepage

Parser generators
Extensible syntax programming languages
Programming language implementation